Ayanna Witter-Johnson (born 1980s) is an English composer, singer, songwriter and cellist. Her notable performances include opening for the MOBO Awards "Pre-Show" in 2016, and playing the Royal Albert Hall, London, on 6 March 2018.

Background and career
Ayanna Witter-Johnson was born in London, England, of Jamaican heritage; her mother is a teacher and her father is a television, film and theatre actor Wil Johnson. She began playing the piano when she was four years old and the cello at 13.

Witter-Johnson completed a first-class degree in Classical Composition at the Trinity Laban Conservatoire of Music and Dance in the UK and won the Trinity Laban Silver Award in 2008, subsequently earning a master's of Music (MMus) degree in Composition at the Manhattan School of Music in the USA. While in America in 2010, she became the first non-American to win first place at the Apollo Theatre's famous Amateur Night, whose previous winners included Ella Fitzgerald and Jimi Hendrix. Witter-Johnson (who shared first place) was the only non-American to have won the competition. She was a MOBO award shortlist nominee ("Best Jazz Act") in 2012.

Performing both classical and contemporary music – she sings while accompanying herself on the cello and has described her song-writing style as "a bit of soul, hip-hop and reggae" – Witter-Johnson has toured with artists including Anoushka Shankar and Courtney Pine, recorded with Akala and composed for the London Symphony Orchestra. She has said: "Some of my inspirations both musical and non-musical are Maya Angelou, Nina Simone, Eckhart Tolle, Bach, Stevie Wonder, Steely Dan, Sojourner Truth, Berio, Stravinsky, Oprah Winfrey, Michael Jackson, Ligeti, Jill Scott, Marcus Garvey and Sting....They have encouraged me to celebrate my authenticity, to explore my unique mode of expression and to write from a place of personal truth."

Awards
2010: Winner of Amateur Night Live at the Apollo Theater in Harlem
2012: Shortlist nominee for "Best Jazz Act" at the MOBO Awards
2011: Edward & Sally Van Lier Fund
2008: Trinity Silver Award
2008: Vivian Prindl Outreach Prize

Selected discography
2020: Crossroads (Single)
2019: Road Runner (Album)
2018: Truthfully Still (EP)
2014: Black Panther (EP)
2011: Truthfully (EP)

References

External links
 Official website
 Ayanna Witter-Johnson (BBC Music)
 Royal Albert Hall: Ayanna Witter-Johnson
 "'Roxanne' | Ayanna Witter Johnson | live at MOBO Awards Pre-Show | 2016", YouTube video.
 "SheCAN: Quick Chat with Ayanna Witter-Johnson", Alt-Africa.

Year of birth missing (living people)
Living people
1980s births
21st-century English women musicians
English people of Jamaican descent
21st-century Black British women singers
Musicians from London
Black British classical musicians
English cellists
21st-century cellists